A Great Big Western Howdy! is a studio recording released by the Western band Riders in the Sky in 1998. It is available as a single CD.

Track listing
 "Wah-Hoo!"
 "A Hundred and Sixty Acres"
 "Cherokee"
 "Autumn on the Trail"
 "The Ballad of Palindrome/Palindrome: The Scene With Johnny  Western"
 "Cowboy Camp Meetin'"
 "The Arms of My Love"
 "Cimarron Moon"
 "The Sidekick Jig"
 "A Border Romance"
 "One More Ride With Marty Stuart"
 "He Walks with the Wild and the Lonely"

Personnel
Douglas B. Green (a.k.a. Ranger Doug) – vocals, guitar
Paul Chrisman (a.k.a. Woody Paul) – vocals, fiddle
Fred LaBour (a.k.a. Too Slim) – vocals, bass
Joey Miskulin (a.k.a. the Cowpolka King) - accordion, vocals
Mark Casstevens - guitar
Richard O'Brien - guitar
Bob Mater - drums, percussion
George Tidwell - trumpet
Brent Truitt - mandolin, Danelectro guitar
Mark Howard - guitar
Kris Wilkinson - violin, viola
David Davidson - violin
Reilly McFeeney - Irish folk flute

External links
Riders in the Sky Official Website

1998 albums
Riders in the Sky (band) albums
Rounder Records albums